Suomi Finland Perkele is the third full-length album by Impaled Nazarene, the last to feature both Luttinen brothers. It is infamous due to its nationalistic themes; for example, in the lyrics to "Total War - Winter War". "Suomi" is the Finnish word for Finland and "perkele" ("devil") is a common Finnish swear word.

Three versions of the sleeve exist: gold on black (OPCD 026-A), black on gold (OPCD 026-B) and black on silver (OPCD 026-C).

Track listing

Personnel
Mika Luttinen: Vocals
Kimmo Luttinen: Drums, Guitars
Jarno Antilla: Guitars
Taneli Jarva: Bass

References

1994 albums
Impaled Nazarene albums
Osmose Productions albums